Benito Iván Guerra Latapí (born 25 March 1985) is a Mexican rally driver competing for Citroën Racing, a privateer team in the FIA World Rally Championship (WRC) in 2013, with his co-driver Borja Rozada.

In 2012 he won the Production World Rally Championship (PWRC) and became a World Champion.

Personal life
His father is Benito Guerra Sr., a vintage racing driver like La Carrera Panamericana and Notary public in Mexico City, his mother is Mercedes Guerra (née Latapí), a CPA. Benito has a younger sister named Mercedes, a fan of motorsport.

Career

2006 – 2010
Guerra Jr. made his World Rally Championship debut on his home event Rally Mexico in 2006, finishing the event in 26th. In 2007 he started both Rally Mexico and Rally Argentina, but retired from both with mechanical problems. He finished 14th on the 2008 Rally México, winning the Group N category. In 2009 he won the Spanish Production title, winning the Spanish gravel title outright in 2010. He finished 15th overall and fourth in PWRC on the 2010 Rally México.

2011
He began 2011 by finishing 11th overall on Rally Mexico, and then committed to a PWRC programme. He finished fourth in PWRC in Portugal, fourth in Australia and third in Spain. At the end of the season Guerra Jr. finished sixth overall, scoring 47 WRC points.

2012

Benito and his co-driver Borja Rozada, won in México, Argentina and España rallies, plus a second place in Germany, thereby the Mexican-Spaniard duo got the PWRC world championship with 109 points, over the Argentinian team Marcos Ligato and Rubén García (88 points). So, Guerra Jr. became the first Mexican rally driver to win a World Championship, and the second Mexican to earn a title in the world of motorsport. Until then Pedro Rodríguez(†) was the only one who had achieved in 1970 and 1971 at the World Sportscar Championship with JW-Porsche.

Race of Champions

As of the 2012, PWRC champion Benito Guerra Jr. is invited to participate in the 25th edition of the Race of Champions, from 14 to 16 December in Bangkok along with racing legends like Michael Schumacher and Sebastian Vettel. His teammate of Team Americas is the Texan Ryan Hunter-Reay, 2012 IndyCar Series champion.

Guerra Jr. said: “This is a great end-of-season challenge and it’s fantastic for my career to be part of ROC 2012. I’m very excited to compete with all of these great drivers and join Team Americas with Ryan Hunter-Reay. See you all in Bangkok!” 

In the Nations Cup race Guerra beats Jorge Lorenzo and the ROC Champion of Champions of 2011, Sébastien Ogier but is defeated by Andy Priaulx, due to a penalty. Therefore, the Team Americas is eliminated in the first round because Hunter-Reay is defeated in two of his three rounds.

For the Champion of Champions event Guerra Jr. bears little fortune and is eliminated in first round. At the end the overall winner of the ROC 2012 is the F1 driver Romain Grosjean.

2013

Due to lack of sponsorship Guerra Jr. did not participate in Monaco and Sweden rallies but in his country México he started with Citroën Racing, a privateer team in the WRC in 2013, with his co-driver Borja Rozada.

On his very first race in the WRC, as a rookie in the category, Guerra gets a great result entering in the top-ten of the Mexican rally, thus he gets his first four points for the championship ending at 8th overall position behind the winner Sébastien Ogier for 12:49.8 minutes.

2019

In the twenty-ninth edition of the Race of Champions, held at Foro Sol in Mexico City, Guerra defeated French driver Loïc Duval, winner of 2013 24 Hours of Le Mans and 2013 WEC, in the final. On his way to the final match against Duval, Guerra Jr. defeated drivers like Sebastian Vettel, Pierre Gasly, Daniel Suárez, Esteban Gutiérrez, among others.

Complete World Rally Championship results

WRC results

PWRC results

WRC-2 results

WRC-3 results

References

External links

 
 
 
 Benito Guerra – Guerra Jr.'s profile at ewrc-results.com
 Benito Guerra – Guerra Jr.'s profile at Race of Champions' official website

Living people
1985 births
Mexican rally drivers
World Rally Championship drivers
Intercontinental Rally Challenge drivers
M-Sport drivers